Jeanie Bryson (born March 10, 1958) is an American singer who sings a combination of jazz, pop, and Latin music. Her repertoire is based on jazz and pop standards from the Great American Songbook and Peggy Lee and Dinah Washington.

Life and career
Bryson is the daughter of composer Connie Bryson and trumpeter Dizzy Gillespie. Her paternity was kept a secret until after Gillespie's death because he was married, but she occasionally saw him growing up. In 1998 Bryson filed a lawsuit against his widow, Lorraine Willis, after her lawyer found court records from 1965 in which Gillespie admitted he was her father. She reached a settlement with his estate.

Bryson grew up in East Brunswick, New Jersey. She began playing instruments at a young age, piano in first grade and then flute in fifth grade. Bryson attended East Brunswick High School. She studied anthropology and ethnomusicology at Livingston College, Rutgers University, graduating in 1981. That year, she performed with her father in Salem County, singing "God Bless the Child" by Billie Holiday. After college she worked in a post office during the week and sang on weekends, by the end of the 1980s she was singing full-time. Bryson released her debut album, I Love Being Here with You, on Telarc in 1993. Her mother contributed the lyrics to two songs on the album. Bryson also sang on an album by Terence Blanchard devoted to Billie Holiday songs.

Bryson has a son, Radji Birks Bryson-Barrett, from the first of her three marriages. Her husband, guitarist Coleman Mellett, died in the February 2009 crash of Colgan Air Flight 3407. The couple lived in East Brunswick, New Jersey.

Discography

References

External links
Jeanie Bryson official website

1958 births
Living people
East Brunswick High School alumni
People from East Brunswick, New Jersey
Rutgers University alumni
American women jazz singers
American jazz singers
21st-century American women